Marie Mävers (born 13 February 1991) is a German field hockey player. At the 2012 Summer Olympics, she competed for the Germany women's national field hockey team in the women's event.  That team finished in seventh.  Mävers returned to the Olympics as part of the German 2016 Olympic team, which won a bronze medal.

References

External links
 

1991 births
Living people
German female field hockey players
Olympic field hockey players of Germany
Field hockey players at the 2012 Summer Olympics
Field hockey players at the 2016 Summer Olympics
Olympic bronze medalists for Germany
Olympic medalists in field hockey
Medalists at the 2016 Summer Olympics
Female field hockey forwards
Field hockey players from Hamburg
21st-century German women

2018 FIH Indoor Hockey World Cup players